Blockade Billy is a 2010 novella by Stephen King. It tells the story of William "Blockade Billy" Blakely, a fictional baseball catcher who briefly played for the New Jersey Titans during the 1957 season. 

The novella took King two weeks to write.  He had the following to say about the novella:

Plot
The book is told through a framing device, where an old man in a retirement home, George "Granny" Grantham, is telling the story to Stephen King. Granny tells of the 1957 Major League Baseball season, when he was the third base coach for a now-defunct team, the New Jersey Titans. 

When the team loses both of their catchers days before the start of the season, they are forced to request a minor league player as a last-minute replacement. The replacement turns out to be a young man named William "Billy" Blakely. Although Billy seems to be feeble minded and highly susceptible to suggestion, he turns out to be a phenomenal player. He becomes especially well known for his incredible stopping power at home plate, earning him the nickname "Blockade Billy" amongst fans. He quickly becomes endeared to the team, especially to star pitcher Danny Dusen, a usually arrogant, self-centered man who adopts Billy as his good luck charm. Granny, however, becomes suspicious of Billy when a player, who was badly injured during a tag out, accuses him of intentionally slicing his ankle. Although Billy claims innocence, and there is no evidence to support the accusation, Granny is convinced that Billy is lying. As the season goes on, Billy's popularity continues to grow. 

One day, Granny arrives before a game to find the team's manager in a state of panic. Refusing to divulge what's wrong, he asks Granny to cover him as manager, only stating that the team deserves one last game together. During the following game, Hi Wenders, an umpire with an antagonistic relationship to the team, makes a bad call, resulting in Granny being thrown out of the game when he argues against it and for cries to "kill the ump" to come from the crowd. Granny returns to the locker room to find the manager with two police officers and a detective. They explain that Billy is an imposter; his real name is Eugene Katsanis, an orphan who worked on the Blakely farm. The real "William Blakely" had seemingly been murdered by Eugene alongside his parents a month previously. Granny reflects on his own speculations of the situation, guessing that Eugene had been abused by the Blakelys, and that the abuse grew worse as the real William, a failing minor league player, became consumed by jealousy over Eugene's superior skill. Eventually, Eugene was provoked into murdering the family. When the call came in requesting Billy as an emergency replacement for the Titans, Eugene decided to assume Billy's identity and report to the team in his place.

Granny is asked to send Eugene to the police alone to be arrested. Despite Granny's attempt to create a convincing pretense for sending him to the locker room, Eugene senses that something is wrong and, rather than going straight there, tracks down Wenders. Following the crowd's demands to kill the umpire, he slashes Wenders' throat before being taken into police custody. Granny goes on to describe the misfortunes the team suffered afterwards and reflects reflecting that despite their adoption of Billy as a good luck charm, he instead served as a black hole of luck, sucking it away from the rest of the team.

Release
The book was published by Cemetery Dance on April 20, 2010 as a trade hardcover, timed to coincide with the opening of the 2010 MLB season. It has cover art by Glen Orbik and interior artwork by Alex McVey. First copies of the book included William Blakely's baseball card. Brian Freeman's Lonely Road Books released a deluxe signed edition of Blockade Billy in the summer of 2010. On May 25, 2010, Simon & Schuster released the novella as an audiobook, as well as a trade edition hardcover, featuring a bonus short story, "Morality" (originally published in the July 2009 issue of Esquire).  A revised version of the story was later included in The Bazaar of Bad Dreams.

Editions
Cemetery Dance Publications trade dustjacketed hardcover edition (April 20, 2010)
1st edition, 1st printing limited to 10,000 copies and comes shrink wrapped with a William "Blockade Billy" Blakely baseball card.  Optional slipcases from Cemetery Dance were available for a limited time at an additional fee
2nd printing limited to 10,000 copies sent to libraries

Scribner trade hardcover (May 25, 2010)
Contains the bonus, previously printed, short story "Morality." It is not scheduled to be illustrated or have a dust jacket (to be released as a paper on boards book)
Simon & Schuster audiobook and e-book (May 25, 2010)
Also contains the bonus previously printed short story "Morality." Craig Wasson will be reading the audiobook version
Lonely Road Books (Summer, 2010)
Signed Limited Edition - comes in a traycase and features new additional artwork from Alex McVey and Glen Orbik (the book will be signed by them too), a William "Blockade Billy" Blakely baseball card, and a signed Stephen King baseball card
Signed Lettered Edition - comes in a hand-made custom box with all of the Limited Edition bonuses plus an original piece of artwork and an art portfolio

Scribner Included in The Bazaar of Bad Dreams collection (Fall of 2015)

Reception
The Washington Post praised the novella, calling it "swift" and "colorful", saying that it works well because of the voice that King gives to the narrator, Granny Grantham, and "the lovingly detailed evocation of the game [baseball] as it was played in 1957".

Bookreporter.com says that the theme is not "especially new", but since it is a King product it is therefore worthy of consideration.

References

External links
The novella at Stephen King's official site
Blockade Billy.com

Novellas by Stephen King
2010 American novels
Baseball novels
New Jersey in fiction
Fiction set in 1957
Cemetery Dance Publications books